The Royal Academy of Cambodia (RAC; ,) is the national academy and university of Cambodia. RAC was originally established by a Royal Decree of 25 August 1965 and placed under the Office of the Council of Ministers. However, by the time war broke out in Cambodia in 1970 it had still not started operations, and in the following years it disappeared completely amidst the turmoil of the Khmer Rouge period.
Efforts to revive the Royal Academy began in March 1997 with the establishment of the Academy of Cambodian History, later the Academy of History. In 1999 this institution became the Royal Academy of Cambodia (RAC), with five sub institutes - the Institute of Biology, Medicine and Agriculture, the Institute of Culture and Fine Arts, the Institute of Humanities and Social Sciences, the Institute of National Language, and the Institute of Science and Technology.

On July 17, 2009, Lok Chumteav Klot Thida was sworn in as president of the academy. The previous president, Sorn Samnang, now serves as an advisor to the Cambodian government.

Prime Minister Hun Sen officially became a member of the Royal Academy of Cambodia in a ceremony held here on April 28. He was appointed as a full member of the Royal Academy of Cambodia by King Norodom Sihamoni in recognition of his competence in leading the country.

Reestablished in 1999, the Royal Academy of Cambodia, the country’s leading research and training institution, has currently 18 full members. The academy offers master and doctoral programs, with an emphasis on social sciences.

See also

Royal Academy of Cambodia website

References

 Cambodia Cultural Profile > Culture in Cambodia > Cultural research > Royal Academy of Cambodia (RAC)

Cambodia
Education in Cambodia
Universities in Cambodia
Science and technology in Cambodia
1965 establishments in Cambodia